The South African National Bowls Championships is organised by Bowls South Africa (BSA). The first National Singles Championships were held in 1897 in Kimberley despite the fact that the South African Bowls Association was not formed until 1904.    

The Rinks was first held in 1906 at Kimberley. The winner received the Pyott Cup and runner-up the Dewar Shield (until 1927 when the Dewar Shield was renamed the Sir David Harris Cup). The event was not held during the Second World War and when it returned in 1948 it featured a squad of up to five players.

Men's Singles Champions

Men's Pairs Champions

Men's Fours/Rinks Champions

Women's Singles Champions

Women's Pairs Champions

Women's Fours Champions

References

Bowls competitions
Bowls in South Africa